Alberta Provincial Highway No. 60, commonly referred to as Highway 60 and officially named Devonian Way, is a north–south highway west of Edmonton in the Canadian province of Alberta, connecting Highway 39 to Highway 16.  In tandem with Highway 19, it is often used as a southwest bypass of Edmonton for travellers wishing to avoid traffic within the city.

Highway 60 begins as a two-lane rural highway east of Calmar in central Leduc County, branching due north from Highway 39 to meet Highway 19 at the south end of Devon where it becomes a divided expressway. Passing west of Devon and entering Parkland County, it bends west to cross the North Saskatchewan River on twin bridges, curving back north across Highways 627 and 628 to reach an interchange with Highway 16A in Acheson. The divided highway briefly reverts to two lanes before expanding again to four lanes and ending at Highway 16 west of Edmonton.

Alberta Transportation has outlined plans to twin the section of Highway 60 between Highways 16 and 16A, as well as long-term plans to realign Highway 60 as a freeway slightly to the west of Devon allowing for a free-flowing connection into a newly twinned Highway 19.

Major intersections 
From south to north:

References 

060